Thubana gilvizonaris is a moth in the family Lecithoceridae. It was described by Kyu-Tek Park in 2013. It is found on Borneo.

The wingspan is 20–21 mm. The forewings are pale brownish orange with a large yellowish-white costal patch occupying one-third to three-fifths length of the costa, with a small, round discal stigma, followed by larger quadrate one in the patch. The hindwings are brownish orange, with a broad orange-white streak along the costa to three-fifths length.

Etymology
The species name refers to the pale yellowish costal patch of the forewing and is derived from Latin  (meaning 'pale yellow').

References

Moths described in 2013
Thubana
Moths of Indonesia